Joan Arden Charlat Murray  (born August 12, 1943), is an American-born Canadian art historian, writer and curator who is an advocate for Canadian art and curators.

Life
Joan Charlat was born in New York City in 1943. She moved to Canada in 1959 to marry W. Ross Murray (1930–2020) and studied art history at the University of Toronto, receiving an Honours B.A. (1965). Murray completed an M.A. at Columbia University in 1966.

Career
In 1969, the Art Gallery of Ontario promoted her to Research Curator, and then to Curator of Canadian Art (the first such Gallery appointment) (1970–1973). At the Gallery, she also served as the Acting Chief Curator (1972). From 1974 to 1999, Murray served as Director of the Robert McLaughlin Gallery in Oshawa where she organized over one hundred exhibitions and built a substantial collection, largely of Canadian art, as well as assisting with the creation of a new building by Arthur Erickson in 1987. In 1999 she retired from the RMG but remained as Director Emerita. Both the Art Gallery of Ontario and the Robert McLaughlin Gallery are considered to have benefitted from her pioneering work on Canadian art. From 2005–2006, Murray served as the Interim Executive Director and Chief Executive Officer of the McMichael Canadian Art Collection in Kleinburg, Ontario.

Writing 
Murray’s writing “glides easily and informatively…she writes with clarity and makes a conscious effort to avoid excessive artspeak.”  Murray was responsible for bringing the paintings of Tom Thomson to world attention through a series of exhibitions and books, including a biography. She has prepared a full-scale catalogue raisonné of his work, a project which took her over fifty years. She also has authored many books on the history of Canadian art, most notably Canadian Art in the Twentieth Century (1999), Northern Lights: Masterpieces of Tom Thomson and the Group of Seven (1994), McMichael Canadian Art Collection: One Hundred Masterworks (2006), and Laura Muntz Lyall: Impressions of Women and Childhood (2012). She has published over one hundred catalogues and two hundred articles on subjects ranging from folk art to contemporary artists. She is also a regular contributor to Wikipedia. 

Murray's collection of papers and over 600 interviews with artists can be found in Library and Archives Canada. Her interviews with war artists have been called critical.

Honours
Murray was elected to the Royal Society of Canada in 1992; and in 1993, was honoured with the Senior Award from the Association of Cultural Executives (A.C.E.) for her outstanding contribution and dedication to Canadian cultural life. She received the Award for Lifetime Achievement from the Ontario Association of Art Galleries in 2000. She received the Order of Ontario in 2003, and the Queen Elizabeth II Diamond Jubilee Medal in 2012. Murray was selected as University College, University of Toronto 2013 Alumni of Influence in 2013.

Books

References

1943 births
Living people
Canadian non-fiction writers
Canadian art historians
Canadian women non-fiction writers
University of Toronto alumni
Columbia University alumni
Women art historians
Members of the Order of Ontario
Canadian women historians
Canadian art curators
Directors of museums in Canada
Women museum directors
Writers from New York City
Fellows of the Royal Society of Canada
Canadian women curators
American emigrants to Canada